Ixora peruviana is a species of shrub or tree in the family Rubiaceae. It is native to South America.

References

peruviana
Trees of Peru
Plants described in 1888